Thomas Huber (born 1966) is a German climber and mountaineer.

Thomas Huber may also refer to:

Thomas Huber (artist) (born 1955), Swiss artist
Thomas Huber (water polo) (born 1963), German water polo player

See also
Thomas Hubert Stinson (1883–1965), member of the Canadian House of Commons